Woodlinkin is a hamlet in Derbyshire, on the A610 road between the villages of Codnor and Aldercar.

Hamlets in Derbyshire
Geography of Amber Valley